The 1928 New York Yankees season was their second and final in the league. The team failed to improve on their previous output of 7–8–1, winning only four games. They finished seventh in the league.

Schedule

Standings

References

New York Yankees (NFL) seasons
New York Yankees
New York Yankees (NFL)
1920s in the Bronx